Manhattan State Hospital can refer to two New York State run psychiatric hospitals for residents of Manhattan that now have different names following state takeovers in the 1890s:

Manhattan Psychiatric Center on Wards Island in New York City
Central Islip Psychiatric Center in Central Islip, New York

See also
 New York State Psychiatric Institute in Manhattan, New York City